The Canadian Association of College and University Student Services (CACUSS) is a professional association representing and serving those individuals who work in Canadian post-secondary institutions in student affairs and services.  Since 1973, CACUSS has provided professional development services and programs for members in all the Canadian provinces. Cross-divisional interest groups called communities of practice and networks were formed by members in 2015 based on their professional needs, focusing on areas such as student health and wellness, first-year students, new professionals, and leadership education.

Communities of Practice 
CACUSS is a comprehensive organization consisting of networks and Communities of Practice representing many topical and functional areas of Student Affairs and Services.

The following communities currently exist: 

 Aboriginal Student Services Assembly (NASSA) 
  Accessibility and Inclusion  
 Academic Learning  
 Community Engaged Learning 
 Co-Curricular Record   
 Digital Communications 
 Equity Seeking Groups 
 Advising 
 Internationalization in Student Affairs 
 Leadership Educators  
 Orientation, Transition, Retention  
 Post-Secondary Student Counselling 
 Campus Mental Health  
 Research Assessment, Evaluation  
 Spirituality and Religious Pluralism  
 Student Case Managers  
 Student Conduct   
 Student Health & Wellness  
 Student Peer Support Programs  
 Students with Family Responsibilities  
 Graduate and Second Entry Student

Resources for Members

Communiqué 
Communiqué is a journal that is published bi-annually by the Canadian Association of College and University Student Services which includes material relevant to college and university student services in Canada.  The journal provides an opportunity for student affairs professionals and senior leadership to keep up to date on current issues and trends, best-practices, new developments, and initiatives.  Anyone is able to contribute content to the publication, not just members of CACUSS.

Health data 
As an information sharing courtesy to its members, CACUSS posts health data from the National College Health Assessment (NCHA).  This nationally recognized research survey is administered in Canada every three years by the American College Health Association. The NCHA is a comprehensive assessment of college student health and it examines:

 Alcohol, tobacco, and other drug use
 Sexual health
 Weight, nutrition, and exercise
 Mental health
 Personal safety and violence

In 2019, there were about 55,000 student respondents, an increase from the 44,000 respondents in 2016. Student affairs professionals can utilize the data to learn about their students’ health and behaviours, to design programs and initiatives applicable to their student populations, and inform resource allocation.  Data can also be used by student affairs professionals, as well as faculty and students, to inform presentations, classes, marketing campaigns, and promotional material.

Student affairs job board 
The CACUSS website posts current job opportunities available in Canada in the student affairs field.  Jobs are submitted by Canadian post-secondary institutions.

Listing of graduate and certificate programs in student affairs 
For new student affairs professionals, or for professionals looking to advance their career, the CACUSS website provides a comprehensive listing of graduate degree and certificate programs offered in Canada.  Each listing includes information on the institution, type of program, style of delivery, area of focus, and contact information for additional information.

Professional Development

Student Affairs and Services Competency Model 
In 2014, CACUSS developed the Student Affairs and Services Competency Model with three goals in mind:  to grow CACUSS as a professional organization, to advance the professionalization of student affairs in Canada, and to support the development of student affairs professionals in Canada.  Building on the ACPA/NASPA Professional Competencies Rubric,  the model was developed through a consultation process with student affairs professionals across Canada, which also included gathering and articulating the shared values that informed student affairs practice specific to Canada.  Student affairs research from around the world also informed the development of the competency model.

The competency model details the values of Canadian student affairs practice:  that student affairs professionals are educators; that student affairs is student-centered and holistic in practice; and that student affairs is a professional and ethical practice.  Each competency is divided into three levels which include core, intermediate, and advanced.  The levels represent increasing skills and knowledge student affairs professionals attain as they advance in their practice. Student affairs professionals can develop their competencies by utilizing this model to inform and guide their professional development as they advance through each of the levels.

The competencies included in the model are:

 Communication
 Emotional and interpersonal Intelligence
 Intercultural
 Indigenous cultural awareness
 Post-secondary acumen
 Equity, diversity and inclusion
 Leadership, management and administration
 Strategic planning, research and assessment
 Student advising, support and advocacy
 Student learning and development
 Technology and digital engagement

Webinars 
CACUSS members, as well as non-members, can access free webinars on the CACUSS YouTube Channel.  Members have access to additional webinars on the members' webpage.

Annual Conference 
CACUSS hosts an annual conference in alternating locations across Canada. Members are encouraged to build presentations and panels, and special guest speakers are asked to attend. The conference is attended by a wide range of professionals (Senior leaders, student life professionals, emerging student affairs professionals, registrarial staff, etc) both as members and non-members of the association The conference provides an opportunity for attendees to network, discuss current issues, share resources and ideas to support students on their campuses.

CACUSS Institutes 
Similar to a conference, Institutes are offered over a period of several days, however they focus on a single theme or topic. They may be hosted by external or partnering affiliations. CACUSS provides detailed information on their upcoming events page. Institutes are an opportunity to develop skills or knowledge in a specific area related to student support and student affairs.

Affiliations 
CACUSS is an associate member of the Association of Universities and Colleges of Canada (AUCC) and a member of the Council for the Advancement of Standards in Higher Education (CAS).

References

External links 
 CACUSS Web Site

Higher education in Canada
Education-related professional associations